Slovakia competed at the 2000 Summer Olympics in Sydney, Australia.

Medalists

Athletics

Men
Track & road events

Field events

Women
Track & road events

Basketball

Women's tournament

Preliminary round
The four best teams from each group advanced to the quarterfinal round.

Group A

Quarterfinals

Classification matches

Team Roster
 Slávka Frniaková
 Martina Godályová
 Renáta Hiráková
 Dagmar Huťková 
 Marcela Kalistová
 Anna Kotočová
 Alena Kováčová
 Lívia Libičová 
 Jana Lichnerová
 Martina Luptáková
 Katarína Poláková
 Zuzana Žirková

Canoeing

Slalom

Sprint
Men

Women

Qualification Legend: 'R = Qualify to repechage; QS = Qualify to semi-final; QF = Qualify directly to final

Cycling

Road
Men

Track
Men's Sprint

Men's Keirin

Team sprint

Judo

Football

Men's team competition
Team roster

 (1.) Kamil Čontofalský
 (2.) Marián Čišovský
 (3.) Miroslav Drobňák
 (4.) Peter Hlinka
 (5.) Peter Lérant
 (6.) Miloš Krško
 (7.) Karol Kisel
 (8.) Michal Pančík
 (9.) Juraj Czinege
 (10.) Miroslav Barčík
 (11.) Ján Šlahor
 (12.) Martin Petráš
 (13.) Martin Vyskoč
 (14.) Andrej Šupka
 (15.) Marek Mintál
 (16.) Radoslav Kráľ
 (17.) Andrej Porázik
 (18.) Martin Lipčák
 (20.) Vratislav Greško
 (21.) Tomáš Oravec
 (22.) Ján Mucha

Group D

Gymnastics

Artistic
Women

Rowing

Men

Sailing

Men

M = Medal race; EL = Eliminated – did not advance into the medal race; CAN = Race cancelled

Shooting

Men

Women

Swimming

Men

Women

Synchronized Swimming

Tennis

Men

Women

Water polo

Preliminary round

Group A

Classification 9th–12th

Team Roster
 Karol Bačo
 Milan Cipov
 Štefan Gergely
 Michal Gogola
 Gejza Gyurcsi
 Jozef Hrošík
 Sergej Charin
 Róbert Kaid
 Alexander Nagy
 Peter Nižný
 Peter Veszelits
 Juraj Zaťovič
 Martin Mravík

Weightlifting

Women

Wrestling

Men's freestyle

References

sports-reference
Wallechinsky, David (2004). The Complete Book of the Summer Olympics (Athens 2004 Edition). Toronto, Canada. . 
International Olympic Committee (2001). The Results. Retrieved 12 November 2005.
Sydney Organising Committee for the Olympic Games (2001). Official Report of the XXVII Olympiad Volume 1: Preparing for the Games. Retrieved 20 November 2005.
Sydney Organising Committee for the Olympic Games (2001). Official Report of the XXVII Olympiad Volume 2: Celebrating the Games. Retrieved 20 November 2005.
Sydney Organising Committee for the Olympic Games (2001). The Results. Retrieved 20 November 2005.
International Olympic Committee Web Site

Nations at the 2000 Summer Olympics
2000
2000 in Slovak sport